Lee Hardman is a former American football coach. He served as the head football coach at the University of Arkansas at Pine Bluff from 1993 to 2003, compiling a record of 64–57.

Head coaching record

College

References

Year of birth missing (living people)
Living people
American football defensive backs
Arkansas–Pine Bluff Golden Lions football coaches
Arkansas–Pine Bluff Golden Lions football players
High school football coaches in Arkansas
People from Stuttgart, Arkansas
Players of American football from Arkansas
African-American coaches of American football
African-American players of American football
21st-century African-American people